The 2019–20 season was Macclesfield Town's second consecutive season in League Two after gaining promotion two seasons previously.

Pre-season
The Silkmen announced pre-season friendlies against Congleton Town and Cheadle Heath Nomads.

Competitions

League Two

League table

Results summary

Results by matchday

Matches
On Thursday, 20 June 2019, the EFL League Two fixtures were revealed.

FA Cup

The first round draw was made on 21 October 2019.

EFL Cup

The first round draw was made on 20 June. The second round draw was made on 13 August 2019 following the conclusion of all but one first round matches.

EFL Trophy

On 9 July 2019, the pre-determined group stage draw was announced with Invited clubs to be drawn on 12 July 2019.

Transfers

Transfers in

Loans in

Loans out

Transfers out

References

Macclesfield Town F.C. seasons
Macclesfield Town